Tímea Gál is a Hungarian football defender currently playing for AS Volos in the Greek A Division. She previously played in the Hungarian First League for MTK Hungária FC, with whom she also played the Champions League, and she is a member of the Hungarian national team.

References

1984 births
Living people
Hungarian women's footballers
Hungary women's international footballers
MTK Hungária FC (women) players
Footballers from Budapest
Women's association football defenders
Expatriate women's footballers in Greece